Trostburg Castle is a small castle in the municipality of Teufenthal in the canton of Aargau in Switzerland.

History

The castle was probably built in the 12th century, though nothing is known of its early history.  At some point in the 12th or early 13th century a junior line moved a short distance away and built Liebegg Castle near Gränichen. On 28 May 1241 Burkhart I of Trostberg and his relative Ludwig of Liebegg appear in a document as witnesses and unfree knights in service to the Counts of Kyburg.  In 1253 Burkhart signed his name as Burchardus Barhandus de Trostberc.  Eventually they passed from Kyburg service to Habsburg service.  In 1317 a knight named Rudolf von Trostberg was the Habsburg vogt at Kyburg Castle.

Around the mid-14 century the Trostburg line died out.  The castle and surrounding estates were inherited by the Lords of Rinach.  In 1415 the city-state of Bern conquered the Aargau from the Habsburgs.  The owner of the castle, Hans Rudolf von Rinach, kept his castle and lands, but was forced to accept Bernese authority and grant them a preeminent right to buy it.  In 1486 the Schultheiss and council of Bern decided to sell Trostburg along with its lands and serfs to Hans von Hallwil, the victor of the Battle of Murten.

Under the Hallwil family, the castle was fortified and expanded with a chapel and residence hall (known as the Hallwil House) added on the northwest side of the site.  It remained with the Hallwil family for 130 years.  In 1616 Hugo von Hallwil moved to Bohemia and tried to sell the castle to the city of Brugg.  Apparently fearing that Brugg was expanding its influence, the city of Bern quickly bought the castle and then sold it to a cooperative of wealthy Bernese citizens.  Bern retained the rights to high justice and some income, which they transferred to Lenzburg Castle.  Over the following century the castle fell into ruin except for the Hallwil House.  In 1754 it was described as looking like a peasant's hovel.

In the 19th century found the castle converted into a music box factory.  In the early 20th century it was partly rebuilt by a German butcher, but World War I prevented project completion.  A large part of the western curtain wall collapsed in 1922.  In 1933 it was acquired by another private owner who used the castle as his private residence.  An archeological project in 1999 explored the history of the castle and also repaired and strengthened many of the walls.

Castle site
The castle is located on the same line of hills on which Liebegg Castle stands and the remaining castle walls wrap around the local hill top. The hill falls away from the tower toward the north, with a courtyard south and west. West and north of the courtyard the ground slopes down toward the Hallwil House.

See also
List of castles and fortresses in Switzerland

Literature 
 Rolf Bolliger and Markus Widmer-Dean: Trostburg - Liebegg, 376 Pages, Verlag Widmer-Dean, 2005

References

External links

 Website of Trostburg Castle
 
 Die Anfänge der Trostburg zwischen Legende und Wirklichkeit (From the Historical Society of the Wynental)
 Aargau Canton Historic Preservation Department

Castles in Aargau